Jbel Hebri is a volcanic cone peaking at 2092m of altitude in the Middle Atlas, in Morocco, south east of the city of Azrou. The mount is most known by the moroccans for its snow tracks where skiing and sledding is possible during winter.

References 

Atlas Mountains
Volcanic cones
Mountains of Morocco
Volcanoes of Morocco